Tsung Yuen Ha is a village in Ta Kwu Ling, North District, Hong Kong.

Administration
Tsung Yuen Ha is a recognised village under the New Territories Small House Policy. It is one of the villages represented within the Ta Kwu Ling District Rural Committee. For electoral purposes, Tsung Yuen Ha is part of the Sha Ta constituency, which is currently represented by Ko Wai-kei.

History
At the time of the 1911 census, the population of Tsung Yuen Ha was 85. The number of males was 39.

References

External links

 Delineation of area of existing village Tsung Yuen Ha (Ta Kwu Ling) for election of resident representative (2019 to 2022)
 Antiquities Advisory Board. Historic Building Appraisal. Nos. 57, 58 & 59 Tsung Yuen Ha Pictures
 Antiquities Advisory Board. Historic Building Appraisal. Kiu Fong Ancestral Hall, Tsung Yuen Ha Pictures
 Antiquities Advisory Board. Historic Building Appraisal. Nos. 61-62 Tsung Yuen Ha Pictures

Villages in North District, Hong Kong